Teesta may refer to:

 Teesta River—the second largest river after the Ganges in Jalpaiguri, West Bengal, India
 Tista River, Norway—a river in the municipality Halden, Norway
 Teesta Setalvad—a human and social rights worker based in Bombay
, a coaster